Plainfield may refer to:

Places

Canada 
 Plainfield, Ontario

United States 
 Plainfield, California
 Plainfield, Connecticut
 Plainfield Village, Connecticut
 Plainfield, Georgia
 Plainfield, Illinois
 Plainfield, Indiana, a town in Hendricks County
 Plainfield, St. Joseph County, Indiana, an unincorporated community
 Plainfield, Iowa
 Plainfield, Massachusetts
 Plainfield, Michigan (disambiguation), several places
 Plainfield, New Hampshire, a town
 Plainfield (CDP), New Hampshire, a census-designated place and village in the town
 Plainfield, New Jersey
 Plainfield, New York
 Plainfield, Ohio
 Plainfield, Pennsylvania
 Plainfield, Vermont, a town
 Plainfield (CDP), Vermont, a census-designated place and village in the town
 Plainfield (town), Wisconsin
 Plainfield, Wisconsin, a village mostly within the town

Other uses 
 Plainfield (soil), a soil series found in the Midwestern US and southern Ontario, Canada

See also 
 Plainfield Academy (disambiguation)
 Plainfield High School (disambiguation)
 Plainfield Township (disambiguation)